Leonard Henry Baker (18 November 1897 – 1979), also known as Lawrie Baker, was an English professional footballer who played as a wing half.

Baker began his professional career with Bill Norman's Blackpool in 1919, during 1918–19 inter-war competitions. When Football League competition resumed the following campaign, Baker made seven appearances, in the final seven games of the season, as the Seasiders obtained a fourth-placed finish.

In  1920–21, he made twelve appearances in sporadic fashion throughout the season, before appearing once in both 1921–22 and 1922–23.

Norman's successor, Frank Buckley, chose not to retain Baker's services for the following term, and sold him to Leeds United.

Baker made eleven League appearances for the Elland Road club, before joining Barnsley in 1925. In four years with the Tykes, he made 78 League appearances, as well as scoring his only League goal.

He joined Rochdale in 1929, for whom he made 34 League appearances, and then finished his career with Nelson.

References

1897 births
1979 deaths
Footballers from Sheffield
English footballers
Association football defenders
Blackpool F.C. players
Leeds United F.C. players
Barnsley F.C. players
Rochdale A.F.C. players
Nelson F.C. players
English Football League players